Eaves may refer to:
 Eaves, the edges of a roof
 Eaves (surname), a surname
 Eaves, Lancashire, a place in England, United Kingdom
 Eaves, a women's housing charity, United Kingdom